Christian Jacques is a Swiss brand of watches based in Basel (Switzerland). Christian Jacques is also one of the last independent brands in the Swiss watch industry.

History 
Founded in 1988 by Christian Bach and Jacques Geeraerts, the brand Christian Jacques has expanded significantly since 1995.

Christian Jacques produces timepieces in Switzerland, under the very strict Swiss Made label. Their watches are available on many markets such as Switzerland, the European Union, Russia, Ukraine, Azerbaijan, the United Arab Emirates, Qatar, the Arab states of the Persian Gulf. Hong Kong, People's Republic of China, Macao and Singapore more recently.

Watch Models 

Their range goes from stainless steel quartz models to exclusive limited editions in solid rose gold (18k) with automatic Valjoux movements, and other refined timepieces with set diamonds, high-tech ceramics, carbon fibers and other noble materials.

Christian Jacques releases one or two new models per year, on top of its already short series, limited editions and various models and versions with own original designs.

Men collection:
 Aviator
 Cubus
 Explorator
 Magister
 Magnus
 Oceanus
 Virtus

Ladies collection:
 Ceramica
 Ignis
 Stella

Limited Edition:
 Eos / 50 pcs
 Ceramagna / 20 pcs

References 

http://www.swisstime.ch/pgs/rwi-pgs-entr-lgs-en-ide-841-zp-zone_info_en.html
https://web.archive.org/web/20100807180817/http://www.watch-wow.com/christian-jacques-turning-dreams-into-reality/
http://www.sunnywatches.com/watches/christian-jacques.html
https://web.archive.org/web/20100730021246/http://www.geekwatches.com/category/christian-jacques
http://watches.infoniac.com/eos-christian-jacques-watch-best.html
http://www.swwatch.com/index.php?ukey=news&blog_id=560
http://www.toffsworld.com/fashion/watch-makers/baselworld-luxury-watchmakers-latest-designs/
https://web.archive.org/web/20110718042426/http://www.whitelinehotels.com/blog/basel-watch-fair/
https://web.archive.org/web/20110708072245/http://watch-happening.blogspot.com/2009/03/baselworld-2009-christian-jacques.html
http://www.hour-hand.com/index.php/Christian-Jacques/
https://web.archive.org/web/20110714000725/http://www.luhho.com/index.php?format=html&Itemid=85&option=com_content&view=article&catid=22:luhho&id=817:baselworld-2010-christian-
https://web.archive.org/web/20100312084702/http://adensya.ru/guide/pj-watches
http://www.hk-pub.com/forum/thread-2821900-1-1.html
http://theescapement.blogspot.com/2010/02/baselworld-2010-preview-pt-iv.html
https://web.archive.org/web/20110706235325/http://baselcatalog.messe.ch/mch/zoomdetails_search.asp?exhibitor=113884
http://www.linternaute.com/homme/mode-accessoires/montres-baselworld-2010/christian-jacques.shtml
https://web.archive.org/web/20100915115645/http://www.wristwatchhaven.com/christian-jacques/christian-jacques-eos-chronograph-wristwatch/
http://watch-wiki.de/index.php?title=Jean-Paul_Luttenauer_AG

External links 

Watch manufacturing companies of Switzerland
Manufacturing companies established in 1988